Cahela is a monotypic snout moth genus described by Carl Heinrich in 1939. Its only species, Cahela ponderosella, the cahela moth, described by William Barnes and James Halliday McDunnough in 1918, is found in Mexico and in the US states of California, Texas, Arizona, Utah and probably Nevada.

The wingspan is about 38 mm. The forewings are slender, brownish gray with black longitudinal lines, along the veins. The hindwings are white with a white fringe and are much wider than the forewings. Adults are on wing from March to June.

The larvae feed on the stems of Cylindropuntia species.

References

Further reading
  Figs. 539, 1027.

Phycitinae
Monotypic moth genera
Moths of North America
Taxa named by Carl Heinrich
Pyralidae genera